Çukurova Sanayi (English: Çukurova Industry) was a professional basketball club that was based in Tarsus, Mersin, Turkey.

History
Çukurova Sanayi was founded in 1978 as Tarsus Schweppes Gençlik ve Spor Kulübü. At the end of the 1991-92 season Çukurova Sanayi has withdrawn from the league due to financial reasons.

During playing in Basketball Super League, Çukurova Sanayi lost the final matches they played with Eczacıbaşı for two seasons. Çukurova Sanayi won Turkish Basketball Presidential Cup by defeating Eczacıbaşı, whom they had been defeated twice in the Basketball Super League finals, in 1989 Turkish Basketball Presidential Cup final.

Honours
 Basketball Super League
 Runners-up (2): 1987–1988, 1988–1989
 Turkish Basketball Presidential Cup
 Winners (1): 1989

Notable players

  Serdar Apaydın (1986–1990)
  Kemal Dinçer (1988–1990)
  Murat Evliyaoğlu (1990–1992)
  Ömer Büyükaycan (1990–1992)
  Erman Kunter (1991–1992)
  Ricky Frazier (1984–1985)
  Larry Spriggs (1987–1988)
  Darryl Middleton (1988–1989)
  Eugene McDowell (1989–1990)
  Richard Coffey (1991–1992)

References

 Durupınar, Mehmet. Türk Basketbolunun 100 Yıllık Tarihi (2009). Efes Pazarlama ve Dağıtım Ticaret A.Ş.

External links
TBLStat.net Profile

Defunct basketball teams in Turkey
Sport in Mersin
Sports clubs disestablished in 1992